Passiflora trochlearis is a species of plant in the family Passifloraceae. It is endemic to the coastal lowlands of Ecuador. It is named after its purple trochlea which stands out from its light green androgynophore.

References

trochlearis
Endemic flora of Ecuador
Vulnerable plants
Taxonomy articles created by Polbot